The Labour Progressive Federation is a trade union federation in Tamil Nadu, India. The LPF is politically attached to the ruling Tamil Nadu party Dravida Munnetra Kazhagam.

History 
According to provisional statistics from the Ministry of Labour, LPF had a membership of 611,506 in 2002.

Leadership 

 All India President–Thiru. Perur A.Natarajan, Ex.M.L.A..  ( Expired)
 All India General Secretary–Thiru. Shanmugam
 All India Treasurer–Thiru. K. Natarajan 
 All India Labour Progressive Federation Election Commissioner–Thiru. S.Viswanathan
 Election Commissioner–S. Viswanathan

Affiliates 

The Workers Progressive Union "WPU" represents NLC workers of India.

It is headed by All India Secretary & General Secretary Thiru. Rajavannian S.

Employees Progressive Union "EPU" represents BHEL workers of India. It is headed by Thiru. P Sathish Kumar No 1 Vice President.  

Telecom Employees Progressive Union "TEPU" represents BSNL workers of India. It is headed by V.Subburaman All India Secretary & General Secretary TEPU.

National Progressive Defence Employees Federation is a joint venture of LPF & TUCC

Thozhilalar Munnetra Sangam, Padaithurai Udaithozhirsalai, is a recognized Union. Thiru. V.Veluswamy is the President and Thiru. A, Mohd Meera is the General Secretary.

All India General Labour Progressive Union represents Un-Organised Sector Labours of India. It is headed by Thiru. T. K. Thamizh Nenjam, All India General Secretary, All India General Labour Progressive Union.

External links
 Labour Progressive Federation Official website

References 

Trade unions in India
 
Dravida Munnetra Kazhagam
1969 establishments in Tamil Nadu
Trade unions established in 1969